The 15 cm Kanone in Eisenbahnlafette (gun on railroad mounting) (15 cm K (E)) was a type of German railroad gun used in the Second World War. They were used in the invasion of Belgium in 1940, but spent most of the war on coast-defense duties.

Design
This weapon was the first modern railroad gun to enter service with the Heer. The gun was mounted on a simple pivot mount on a ballrace on a well-base flatcar with four outriggers. In action the outriggers and their jacks would be dropped to stabilize the gun and absorb the firing recoil. In addition jacks locked the spring suspension, bore on the surface of the rails and screw clamps gripped the rails for more stability. The elderly 15 cm Schnelladekanone L/40 was used because it was available in some numbers.

Ammunition
The standard high-explosive shell was the 15 cm K Gr 18, a  nose-fuzed round containing  of TNT. An anti-concrete shell was also available, the 15 cm Gr 19 Be.

Combat history
Two guns were damaged by premature detonations in their barrels on 20 May 1940 while bombarding Liège. They spent most of the war assigned to Artillery Battery (Artillerie-Batterie) 655 (E) in Belgium on coast-defense duties along the Channel coast.

Note
Sources are contradictory on the gun used and numbers produced of this weapon. The most recent source, François, has been generally been followed, not least because he cites serial numbers. Do not confuse this gun with those of Naval Artillery Battery (Marine-Artillerie-Batterie) "Gneisenau" that used a slightly more modern 15 cm SK L/45 gun with a gun shield.

Citations

References 
 Engelmann, Joachim and Scheibert, Horst. Deutsche Artillerie 1934-1945: Eine Dokumentation in Text, Skizzen und Bildern: Ausrüstung, Gliederung, Ausbildung, Führung, Einsatz. Limburg/Lahn, Germany: C. A. Starke, 1974
 François, Guy. Eisenbahnartillerie: Histoire de l'artillerie lourd sur voie ferrée allemande des origines à 1945. Paris: Editions Histoire et Fortifications, 2006
 Gander, Terry and Chamberlain, Peter. Weapons of the Third Reich: An Encyclopedic Survey of All Small Arms, Artillery and Special Weapons of the German Land Forces 1939-1945. New York: Doubleday, 1979 
 Hogg, Ian V. German Artillery of World War Two. 2nd corrected edition. Mechanicsville, PA: Stackpole Books, 1997 
 Kosar, Franz. Eisenbahngeschütze der Welt. Stuttgart: Motorbuch, 1999 

World War II artillery of Germany
Railway guns
150 mm artillery
Military equipment introduced in the 1930s